Rose Prince (born 4 December 1962) is a food writer, author, cook and activist. Her writing career started in her mid thirties, after she worked as a chef and the cook in the Notting Hill specialist bookshop, Books for Cooks. She worked there with Clarissa Dixon Wright. She was the in-house cook at The Spectator magazine for seven years.

Career 
She has a weekly column in The Daily Telegraph. Her columns are widely syndicated. She also has a monthly column in the Catholic weekly, The Tablet (although herself an Anglican she is married to a Catholic). She is a prolific writer and contributes to The Daily Mail, The Spectator, The Times, and Sunday Telegraph. For three years she had a column on The Daily Express. In 2000 she produced a two-part biopic about the food writer Elizabeth David for British broadcaster Channel 4, which also aired in Australia.

She contributes regularly to BBC Radio 4's The Food Programme and was a judge for its Food and Farming Awards in 2009. She was a member of the House of Lords Committee of Inquiry into the meat industry in 2000. She was the winner of a Glenfiddich Food and Drink Award in 2001 and in 2009 was named by Vogue magazine as one of the most inspirational women in Britain.

In 2011 she launched the Pocket Bakery with her children Jack and Lara (then 8 and 11 years old), a community bakery run in her Battersea kitchen making slow fermentation (sourdough) breads for the neighbourhood. In 2012 the bakery transferred its weekly pop-up to the Doodle Bar in Battersea, providing pastries and bread for locals. A non-profit business, the children received pocket money as an income and other young workers were invited to take part with paid training in enterprise and baking skills.

Personal life 
She is married to Dominic Prince, a fellow journalist and sometime amateur jockey. They have two children, Jack and Lara.

Publications

 
 
 
 
 
The Pocket Bakery. Weidenfeld & Nicolson, 2013.
Dinner & Party. Seven Dials (Orion), 2017.

References

External links

1962 births
Living people
British food writers
Women food writers
Women cookbook writers